The 1927 Georgia Normal Blue Tide football team represented Georgia Normal School—now known as Georgia Southern University– during the 1927 college football season. The team was coached by Hugh A. Woodle, in his first year.

Schedule

References

Georgia Normal
Georgia Southern Eagles football seasons
Georgia Normal Blue Tide football